Althenia marina is a plant found in brackish to marine waters in Australia. The species has been transferred from the genus Lepilaena.

References

External links

Potamogetonaceae